Ivories may refer to:

 Ivory carvings, objects made from ivory
 Piano keys, slang as keys were made from ivory until the 1950s
 Dice, slang as dice were made from ivory from ancient times into the 20th century
 Teeth, slang as teeth are composed of much of the same material as ivory